Andrea Holmes (born 3 January 1982) is a former Canadian Paralympic athlete, para-athlete in long jump, alpine ski, 100m run and high jump, and a Paralympic torchbearer.

History
Holmes wears a prosthetic on her left leg. She was born with fibular hemimelia and her parents chose to amputate her left foot, so that she could have a more active lifestyle.

As an athlete, she represented Canada from 2002 to 2007, winning a bronze medal for long jump at the Para-Pan American Games in 2007. She was also part of the BC Para-Alpine ski team, and placed third in 2008 in alpine.

She has been the Canadian long jump champion four times, the 100m champion three times and holds a Canadian record in high jump.

She is the subject of Coni Martin's short documentary My Favourite Leg, which was shown at the Vancouver International Women in Film Festival and Langara College's Just Film Festival. The film premiered at the United Nations Headquarters in New York City as part of the United Nations Enable Film Festival.

She was also a Paralympic torchbearer.

Her coach was Victoria-based Ron Parker.

Holmes completed a degree in International Business at the University of Victoria. After the 2010 Paralympics, Holmes retired from competition and became a banker, having taken part in the RBC Olympian program. She has a daughter.

She has several prosthetic legs—for running, swimming, dress and everyday use.

References

External links
 

1982 births
Living people
Canadian female long jumpers
Canadian female high jumpers
Canadian female sprinters
Canadian female alpine skiers
Paralympic track and field athletes of Canada
Paralympic alpine skiers of Canada
Track and field athletes with limb difference
Canadian disabled sportspeople
Sportswomen with disabilities
Medalists at the 2007 Parapan American Games
21st-century Canadian women